piri & tommy (stylised in lowercase) were an English drum and bass group, formed in 2021. The group was formed of Sophie "piri" McBurnie and Tommy Villiers. The pair charted at number 99 in the Official UK Charts with their single "on & on". They released their debut mixtape froge.mp3 in October 2022. PinkPantheress and Charli XCX are fans of the group. They have received a total of over 31 million streams on Spotify, and can be heard frequently on the BBC Radio 1 playlist.

History
McBurnie and Villiers first met in 2021 through Instagram when McBurnie found Villiers' account, messaged him, and they later started dating. They then formed the group after discussing their shared love for dance artists like Disclosure and Kaytranada. Their first single "soft spot" received over 18 million streams on Spotify most of which coming from the song being used in a large number of TikTok videos, including by celebrities such as Molly-Mae Hague. Rebecca Black also gave a shout-out to the song. Further singles include "on & on" as well as "beachin". These then became the three singles from their debut mixtape "froge.mp3", which they released in October 2022. In November 2022, piri and tommy released a cover version of Charli XCX's song "Unlock It" which became popular on TikTok with an accompanying dance. piri & tommy were also announced to be a nominee of BBC Radio 1's Sound of 2023 in December 2022, along with other artists like DYLAN, Cat Burns and FLO. In January 2023, McBurnie announced via TikTok that herself and Villiers had split up. Later that month, she stated that they will no longer be a band, and will go backwards to how their Streaming Platform Releases were formatted for their debut single. They also received Breakup Coverage from Capital Dance.

Musical style and influences
Critics categorised the band's music as drum and bass, pop, and dance.

McBurnie has stated that she grew up with artists such as the Arctic Monkeys however, her current inspiration mainly comes from Disclosure, MJ Cole and PinkPantheress. Villiers lists Red Hot Chili Peppers, The Meters, Ed Rush and Lemon Jelly as some artists he grew up listening to, but says he takes current inspiration from Disclosure and Kaytranada.

Discography

Mixtapes
froge.mp3 (2022)

Singles

References 

English drum and bass musicians
Drum and bass music groups
English dance music groups
Drum and bass duos
Musical groups established in 2021
Musical groups from London
Polydor Records artists